Kite Stories is the twentieth solo studio album from British musician Brian Eno, released in 1999.

Overview
An Opal release, with no catalogue number, this title is only available from EnoShop.

The music on the album is taken from an installation—a show featuring music and visuals—that took place at the Kiasma Museum of Contemporary Art in Helsinki, Finland, from 11 December 1999 to 6 February 2000.

The installation included a generative music system and a collection of objects chosen for their spatial presence – stones, sand and light sculptures. The original music was composed of eight layers of sound, each one playing on a CD player situated somewhere in the gallery, the sounds from which were all looped, providing an almost infinite variety of sonic possibilities. The music on the CD, at only half an hour in length, is a very much curtailed version of something that lasted for two months.

Eno made the music in his studios in London. He said "I think of shows like this as 'music in more dimensions' or perhaps 'music for more senses' .... a process more similar to painting or collage than conventional music composition. One element in it is nearly 20 years old; most of it was made last week. The music is divided into 8 independent layers, one of which is playing on each CD player. Since these players are not synchronized, the music constantly recombines into different patterns".

The heavily treated, slowed-down & stretched-out vocals on parts II & III are based on a Japanese ghost-story, Onmyo-Ji, by Reiko Otano and was read by Kyoko Inatome, a waitress from his favorite sushi restaurant. Eno comments "I time-stretched her readings using Sound-Designer software, and then re-pitched the stretched voice using Digitech Studio Vocalist".

"The stars are faraway suns
In the temple of heaven
Another name for it is
The temple of little lights"

The three tracks on this album are also on Music for Installations.

Track listing 
 Kites I – 8:06
 Kites II – 7:34
 Kites III – 14:30

Credits
 Brian Eno: cover art
 Special thanks to:
 Marlon Weyeneth: technical assistant to Brian Eno
 Catherine Dempsey: organisation (London)
 Charmian Norman-Taylor: administration and Japanese-English translation at Kiasma

References

External links
 Beep discography entry
 Discogs.com entry
 Hyperreal report of the Installation
 Kiasma homepage

Brian Eno albums
1999 albums